Clan of Xymox, also known as simply Xymox, are a Dutch rock band from Nijmegen formed in 1981 best known as pioneers of darkwave music. Clan of Xymox featured a trio of singers and songwriters – Ronny Moorings, Anka Wolbert, and Pieter Nooten – and gained success in the 1980s, releasing their first two albums on 4AD, before releasing their third and fourth albums on Wing Records and scoring a hit single in the United States. Their 1980s releases included synthpop/electronic dance music. The band is still active, continuing to tour and release records with Moorings as the sole remaining original songwriter and singer.

History

4AD and the Peel Sessions (1983–1988)

Clan of Xymox were formed in Nijmegen, Netherlands, in 1983 by Ronny Moorings (guitars, vocals) and Anka Wolbert (bass, vocals). A year later, Moorings and Wolbert moved to Amsterdam, releasing the mini-album Subsequent Pleasures as Xymox. The album was limited to 500 copies.

"Ronny and I met as students in Nijmegen and we connected over our taste in music. We started making music together and picked up some equipment to experiment with, like the Korg MS-10 and a rhythm machine...We started to perform live, just the two of us, changing instruments in between songs. While I had a bass guitar strapped around my neck and simultaneously hit the monophonic keyboard, Ronny played guitar and sang. We combined our sound with tape loops, a Casio, plus a few weird instruments."

Named from zymotic (of or causing fermentation), the band formed as a project of Ronny Moorings and Anka Wolbert in Nijmegen, Netherlands in 1983, before moving to Amsterdam and joining Pieter Nooten (Moorings' Nijmegen flat-mate) and Frank Weyzig, who added their own contributions, Assuming the name "Xymox", the group released a five-track EP entitled, Subsequent Pleasures, in 1983. They were invited by Brendan Perry to support Dead Can Dance on a UK tour and were signed to the indie label 4AD, which released their eponymous debut album in 1985. The track 7th Time, with Anka Wolbert on lead vocals, was picked up by John Peel, leading to the band recording two of the Peel Sessions at the BBC, in June and November 1985. Peel referred to the band's dark and melancholic sound as "darkwave".

In 1986, they released their second and last album on 4AD, Medusa, before signing with PolyGram. Simultaneously, Pieter Nooten recorded and released his album Sleeps with the Fishes (4AD, 1987), in collaboration with Canadian session musician Michael Brook. In a 2010 interview with AlterNation Magazine, Moorings expressed disappointment at the divided interests of the band members at this stage, exclaiming Medusa's follow-up album was "made entirely independently, without the rest of the musicians, who were then on vacation."

PolyGram and international success (1988–1991)

Now abbreviated as Xymox, the band's third album, Twist of Shadows, was released in 1989. This album, and its successor Phoenix, were released by Wing Records, a subsidiary of Polydor Records/PolyGram. In the United States, these two albums created a cult following for the band. The first two singles taken from the Twist of Shadows album, "Blind Hearts" and "Obsession", proved college and club hits in the United States, with Obsession charting on Billboards Alternative Songs chart and both tracks hitting the Billboard Club Play Chart.

It was the album's third single, "Imagination" (with Anka Wolbert on lead vocals), that brought the band the most mainstream attention, charting at No. 85 on Billboard Hot 100, generating Top 40 radio airplay and MTV rotation of the "Imagination (Edit)" single video. Twist of Shadows proved their most commercially successful album, selling more than 300,000 copies worldwide.

By this time the band had moved to England and released their fourth album, Phoenix, on PolyGram in 1991; after this album, Anka Wolbert and Pieter Nooten left the band due to disagreements about the band's musical direction.

Independent labels and move to Germany (1991–Present)

Xymox, without Nooten and Wolbert, left PolyGram to release the UK acid house inspired LPs Metamorphosis (1992) and Headclouds (1993) independently. These albums marked a break from the dark wave sound of the 1980s and met with poor record sales in the United States, which had moved towards a markedly different grunge sound at the time. Ronny Moorings toured under the banner of Xymox until 1994 with an evolving cast of live musicians, including girlfriend and future band member Mojca Zugna. Frank Weyzig (the last of the original line-up) parted ways with Moorings after the 1994 tour, after which Moorings moved back to the Netherlands and took a three-year hiatus from music-writing.

Capitalizing on a resurgence in the popularity of gothic rock and the success of bands such as Nine Inch Nails and Rammstein, 1997 saw Moorings reverting the name to Clan of Xymox and moving to Germany – then the center of the burgeoning industrial music scene – to resume songwriting. Moorings recruited new live members and signed with the independent US label Tess Records in 1997 then with Metropolis in 1998. The LPs Hidden Faces (1997), Creatures (1999) and Notes from the Underground (2001) reflect an increasingly electro sound while maintaining the distinctive dance rhythms associated with the Clan of Xymox catalog. In 1998, 4AD re-released Clan of Xymox and Medusa in the US, and Xymox toured the United States the following year. 2003's FareWell featured several charting tracks internationally. Most recently, the LP Matters of Mind, Body and Soul was released on Trisol, Metropolis and Gravitator record labels for European, American and Russian distribution, respectively, in February 2014.

In addition to intermittent original releases, Clan of Xymox has contributed to a number of compilations and side projects since conception. In 1987, the track "Moscoviet Mosquito" was re-recorded and released on the 4AD compilation album Lonely Is an Eyesore. In October 2000 the band released Live, a double CD with nineteen tracks and two videos featuring live performances of Xymox songs from the 4AD, Polygram, and independent eras. In September 2004, a Best of Clan of Xymox album was released with re-recorded versions of early hits as well as later offerings. In 2011, the track "In Your Arms Again" from the LP Darkest Hour was included on the soundtrack to David Fincher's The Girl with the Dragon Tattoo. In 2012 the band released a cover album, Kindred Spirits, featuring covers of several influential post-punk and new wave groups in Mooring's own musical styling. The songs "A Day", "Masquerade", and "Cry in the Wind" were featured on the official soundtrack to the 2014 film The Guest.

In a touring capacity, Clan of Xymox is best known as a headlining act for several annual international alternative music festivals, including M'era Luna Festival in Hildesheim, Germany, Triton Festival in New York City, Summer Darkness in Utrecht, Netherlands, Whitby Gothic Weekend in Whitby, England, and the largest – Wave-Gotik-Treffen, in Moorings' current home of Leipzig, Germany.

Discography

Studio albums
Clan of Xymox (LP, CD, 4AD, 1985)
Medusa (LP, CD, 4AD, 1986)
Twist of Shadows (LP, CD, CS, Wing, 1989) - under Xymox
Phoenix (LP, CD, CS, Wing Records/Polydor, 1991) - under Xymox (last with original line-up)
Metamorphosis (CD, CS, Mogull Entertainment/X-ULT, 1992) - under Xymox
Headclouds (LP, CD, CS, Zok/Off-Beat, 1993) - under Xymox
Hidden Faces (CD, Tess, 1997)
Creatures (CD, Metropolis/Pandaimonium, 1999; re-released, Gravitator, 2006)
Notes from the Underground, (CD, Metropolis/Pandaimonium, 2001; re-released, Gravitator, 2007)
Farewell (CD, Metropolis/Pandaimonium, 2003; re-released, Gravitator, 2007)
Breaking Point (CD, Gravitator/Metropolis/Pandaimonium/Vision Music, 2006)
In Love We Trust, (CD, Trisol/Metropolis/Gravitator, 2009 - LP, Trisol 2015)
Darkest Hour, (CD, Trisol/Metropolis Records 2011 - LP, Trisol 2018)
Matters of Mind, Body & Soul, (CD, Trisol/Metropolis 2014 - LP, Trisol 2018)
Days of Black, (CD, Trisol/Metropolis 2017 - LP, Trisol 2017)
Spider on the Wall, (CD, Trisol/Metropolis 2020)
 Limbo, (CD, Digital,  Metropolis, 2021)

Cover album
Kindred Spirits, (CD, Trisol/Metropolis 2012 - LP, Trisol 2018)

Singles/EPs
Subsequent Pleasures (vinyl 12", self-released, 1983) - under Xymox
"A Day" (12", 4AD, 1986; re-released, Old Gold, 1998)
"A Day/Stranger" (12", Contempo, 1985)
"Louise" (7", Megadisc, 1986)
"Muscoviet Musquito" (promotional 7", Virgin France 1986)
"Blind Hearts" (12", 4AD/Rough Trade, 1987)
"Blind Hearts" (12", Wing, 1989; different songs than from the 4AD release)
"Obsession" (12", Wing/PolyGram, 1989)
"Imagination" (12" and CD-single, Wing, 1989)
"Phoenix" (CS and LP, Polydor, 1991)
"Phoenix of My Heart" (Maxi CD and 12", Wing/Polydor, 1991)
"At the End of the Day" (Maxi CD and 12", Wing, 1991)
"Out of the Rain" (Maxi CD, Tess, 1997)
"This World" (Maxi CD, Tess, 1998)
"Consolation" (Maxi CD, Metropolis, 1999)
"Liberty" (Maxi CD, Metropolis/Pandaimonium, 2000)
The John Peel Sessions (CD EP, Strange Fruit, 2001; re-released, Celebration', 2003)
"There's No Tomorrow" (Maxi CD, Pandaimonium, 2002)
"Weak in My Knees" (Maxi CD, Pandaimonium, 2006)'
"Heroes" (Pandaimonium, 2007)
"Emily" (Maxi CD, Trisol, 2009)
"She" (Metropolis, 2020)
"Lovers" (Metropolis, 2020)
"All I Ever Know" (Metropolis, 2020)

Remixes
"Dream On/XDD" (12", X-ULT, 1992)
"Reaching Out" (Maxi CD and 12", Zok, 1993)
"Spiritual High (Club Mix)" (promotional 12", Zok, 1993)
"Remix" – (CD, Zok, 1994)

Live albumsLive (CD, Metropolis/Pandaimonium, 2000)Live at Castle Party (CD, Big Blue Records, 2011)

CompilationsRemixes from the Underground (double CD, Metropolis/Pandaimonium, 2002)The Best of Clan of Xymox (CD, Metropolis/Pandaimonium/Vision Music/Irond, 2004)Visible (double DVD, Pandaimonium/Gravitator/Vision Music, 2008)

Remixes of other artists
I:Scintilla, "Scin", on Optics'' (2007)

References

External links
 clanofxymox.com Official site
 clanofxymox.org New official interactive site (not working as of 11/14/2021)
 clanofxymox.nl fan site
 http://www.unruhr.de/musik/revue/3019-clan-of-xymox-subsequent-pleasures-1982-1985-biographie-teil-1
 http://www.unruhr.de/musik/revue/3020-clan-of-xymox-medusa-1986-1987-biographie-teil-2
 http://www.unruhr.de/musik/revue/3021-clan-of-xymox-imagination-1988-1991-biographie-teil-3
 http://www.unruhr.de/musik/revue/3022-clan-of-xymox-metamorphosis-biographie-teil-4
 http://www.unruhr.de/musik/revue/3023-post-clan-of-xymox-anka-pieter-frank-biographie-teil-5
 https://www.concertarchives.org/bands/clan-of-xymox

4AD artists
Dutch dark wave musical groups
Dutch gothic rock groups
Dutch new wave musical groups
Dutch electronic rock musical groups
Metropolis Records artists
Musical groups established in 1981
Musical quartets